Minchu is a serial telecast in Kannada language on ETV Kannada channel. It is being produced by T.N. Seetharam, who has previously directed many serials like Mukta (TV series), Manvantara (TV series) etc. The serial is running successfully all over Karnataka. The story includes a villain murdering his own wife for her property and more stuff is about to come in the coming days. Minchu in Kannada means thunder bolt.

References

Indian television series